Bett may refer to:

People with the surname
 Baldur Bett (born 1980), Icelandic footballer
 Calum Bett (born 1981), Icelandic footballer
 Darren Bett (born 1968), BBC weather forecaster
Elva Bett (1918 - 2016), New Zealand artist, art historian and art gallery director
 Emmanuel Bett (born 1985), Kenyan long-distance runner
 Franklin Bett (born 1953), Kenyan politician
 Jim Bett (born 1959), Scottish former professional footballer
 Mark Bett (born 1976), Kenyan long-distance runner
 Nicholas Bett (1990–2018), Kenyan hurdler
 Richard Bett, British philosopher

Other uses
 Bett (slave name), Mum Bett (servant nickname) of Elizabeth Freeman (c.1742-1829)
 BETT, an annual educational trade show held in London.

See also
 Miss Lulu Bett (disambiguation)
 Bette (disambiguation)
 Betts